"You Carry Me" was released on May 20, 2014, as the lead single from Moriah Peters' second studio album, Brave.

Composition
"You Carry Me" is originally in the key of C Major, with a tempo of 90 beats per minute. Written in common time, Peters vocal range spans from A3 to D5 during the song.

Charts

Weekly charts

Year-end charts

References

2014 singles
2014 songs
Songs written by Jeff Pardo
Songs written by Mia Fieldes
Songs written by Chuck Butler